Oxalyl chloride is an organic chemical compound with the formula (COCl)2. This colorless, sharp-smelling liquid, the diacyl chloride of oxalic acid, is a useful reagent in organic synthesis.

Preparation
Oxalyl chloride was first prepared in 1892 by the French chemist Adrien Fauconnier, who reacted diethyl oxalate with phosphorus pentachloride. It can also be prepared by treating oxalic acid with phosphorus pentachloride.

Oxalyl chloride is produced commercially from ethylene carbonate.  Photochlorination gives the tetrachloride, which is subsequently degraded:
C2H4O2CO  +  4 Cl2  →  C2Cl4O2CO  +  4 HCl
C2Cl4O2CO  →  C2O2Cl2  +  COCl2

Reactions
Oxalyl chloride reacts with water giving off gaseous products only: hydrogen chloride (HCl), carbon dioxide (CO2), and carbon monoxide (CO).

In this, it is quite different from other acyl chlorides which hydrolyze with formation of hydrogen chloride and the original carboxylic acid.

Applications in organic synthesis

Oxidation of alcohols
The solution comprising DMSO and oxalyl chloride, followed by quenching with triethylamine converts alcohols to the corresponding aldehydes and ketones via the process known as the Swern oxidation.

Synthesis of acyl chlorides
Oxalyl chloride is mainly used together with a N,N-dimethylformamide catalyst in organic synthesis for the preparation of acyl chlorides from the corresponding carboxylic acids. Like thionyl chloride, the reagent degrades into volatile side products in this application, which simplifies workup. One of the minor byproducts from the N,N-dimethylformamide catalyzed reaction is a potent carcinogen, stemming from the N,N-dimethylformamide decomposition. Relative to thionyl chloride, oxalyl chloride tends to be a milder, more selective reagent. It is also more expensive than thionyl chloride so it tends to be used on a smaller scale.

This reaction involves conversion of DMF to the imidoyl chloride derivative (Me2N=CHCl+), akin to the first stage in the Vilsmeier–Haack reaction. The imidoyl chloride is the active chlorinating agent.

Formylation of arenes
Oxalyl chloride reacts with aromatic compounds in the presence of aluminium chloride to give the corresponding acyl chloride in a process known as a Friedel-Crafts acylation. The resulting acyl chloride can be hydrolysed to form the corresponding carboxylic acid.

Preparation of oxalate diesters
Like other acyl chlorides, oxalyl chloride reacts with alcohols to give esters:

Typically, such reactions are conducted in the presence of a base such as pyridine. The diester derived from phenol, phenyl oxalate ester, is Cyalume, the active ingredient in glow sticks.

Other
Oxalyl chloride was reportedly used in the first synthesis of dioxane tetraketone (C4O6), an oxide of carbon.

Precautions
In March 2000, a Malaysia Airlines Airbus A330-300 was damaged beyond repair after a cargo of prohibited oxalyl chloride (falsely declared as hydroxyquinoline) leaked into the cargo bay. It is toxic by inhalation, although it is over an order of magnitude less acutely toxic than the related compound phosgene.

See also
Oxalyl
Swern oxidation

References

Acyl chlorides
Carbon oxohalides